Jurnal TV represents a general TV channel from the Republic of Moldova, launched in 2009 on Internet and in 2010 in ether, which transmits in Romanian and partially in Russian. Initially it was created to be the first news television of Republic of Moldova. But on 5 March 2011 it was transformed into a general television. In present, the TV program contains news journals on certain hours during the day, political/social/entertaining shows and talk-shows, movies, TV series, cartoons dubbed in Romanian or Russian, all of them being broadcast with a proper license, condemning the piracy. Also, Jurnal TV takes part in the social life of the country, launching social successful campaigns.

The headquarters of Jurnal TV include own studios.
Jurnal TV is part of the Jurnal Trust Media Holding, which includes the radio station Jurnal FM, the newspaper Jurnal de Chișinău, the economic magazine ECOnomist and the publicity agency Reforma Art.

Jurnal TV HD is the first High Definition (1080i) television in Moldova. It has begun its experimental broadcast on Moldtelecom IPTV Platform from 7 December. Jurnal TV HD broadcast in 16:9 aspect ratio on both modes: SD and HD and Dolby Surround 5.1 sound on HD, and Stereo on SD.

Shows and Talk shows 

Deșteptarea și Deșteptarea de Weekend – A morning show 7/7, with presenters, guests and various sections: Social news, The economic section, Weather, Sport, contests for the viewers, etc.

Acasă Devreme – An interactive after lunch show, that contains information about health, events, relations, beauty and modern technologies.

Veranda – An afternoon show, for the whole family, partially a food show, but with special guests from the show business.

Ora de Ras – A weekly show that is a filter, mocking the incompetence, the lack of taste and culture, by being ironical and satirical. It covers fields like politics, show-business, mass-media and the life of the simple citizen.

Asfalt de Moldova - Revenirea acasă – A weekly show,that shows interesting personalities in Moldova.

 Paparazzi – A weekly show about local celebrities.

Ora Expertizei – Talk show that reflects events of major interest, discussed on the first pages of the entire mass-media.

Cabinetul din Umbră – Political talk show where are invited experts which debate most important politic events of the week.

Прямой Разговор – Political talk show about all the fields: sport, religion, the local or international reality, together with special guests and live dialogues.

Mai pe scurt – Immediately after the news Journal at 7 p.m. Political talkshow.

Patrula Jurnal TV – A review of the week about the cruelest crimes and law violations.

Campaigns 

Poftă mare, Chișinău! – Every year Jurnal TV viewers are surprised by gourmet records. Jurnal TV presenters are cooking traditional dishes from different countries. It started with Romanian traditional food, then Spanish, Italian, German. At the end of each show the dishes are given to people who decide to spend the Chisinau Day with Jurnal TV's team.

La Cireşe - A unique and very colorful festival that had beaten any record at its first edition, by gathering together more than 20,000 people who have had pleasant surprises, tons of cherry, thousands of pies, and all sorts of fruits and handicrafts.

Moldova, eu chiar te iubesc! – A social campaign launched on 27 August 2011, on the Independence Day, that promotes cultural values.

Târgul Cadourilor Inutile "Fă-ți cadoul util!"- Was held in one of the shopping centers in Chişinau. Visitors were encouraged to exchange unuseful gifts between them, in this way, all gifts become useful.

Moș Crăciun există, Moș Crăciun ești tu! - Is a campaign that promotes the message that each of us can be Santa by helping others. With this occasion Jurnal TV released a Carol that express warmth and love for our fellow.

JurnalTVerde – A greening campaign, which began in Chişinău and expanded to Balţi, Cahul, Ungheni, Orhei. Presenters from Jurnal TV together with celebrities, people from Green Spaces and locals have participated in greening and cleaning parks.

Jurnal TV îți face curte! – Jurnal TV was making stories about the problems that face the tenants and passed them to the local authorities to be solved.

Bea cu minte! – Social campaigns that informed the society of the consequences of drinking alcohol. 
etc.

Films, TV series, Cartoons 
Jurnal TV condemns piracy and promotes copyrighting, that's why all the products are broadcast under license. The company works with Warner Bros., Fox, NBCUniversal, BBC, Walt Disney, etc.

TV series shown or showed: House MD, Lie to Me, Prison Break, Lost, Supernatural, Chicago Hope, Alias, The Pretender, Friends, Angel, Buffy, La Femme Nikita, Bones, etc.

Cartoons shown or showed: The Simpsons, StarGate Infinity, Bugs Bunny, Tom and Jerry, Kids, etc.

Also, it broadcasts Just for Laughs and Earth TV Live.

External links 
 JurnalTV.md
 Jurnal.md
 YouTube channel
 Moldova launching its first News TV channel 
 "Competition between "Jurnal TV" and "Publika TV" was crazy" Val Butnaru: Jurnal TV is changing its broadcast character, from news-only to generalist

Television channels and stations established in 2009
Television channels in Moldova
24-hour television news channels in Moldova
Television networks in Moldova
Romanian-language television networks in Moldova
Jurnal Trust Media